Simon David Goldhill, FBA (born 17 March 1957) is Professor in Greek literature and culture and fellow and Director of Studies in Classics at King's College, Cambridge. He was previously Director of Centre for Research in the Arts, Social Sciences, and Humanities (CRASSH) at the University of Cambridge, succeeding Mary Jacobus in October 2011. He is best known for his work on Greek tragedy.

In 2009, he was elected a fellow of the American Academy of Arts and Sciences. In 2010, he was appointed as the John Harvard Professor in Humanities and Social Sciences at Cambridge, a research position held concurrently with his chair in Greek.

In 2016, he became a fellow of the British Academy. He is a member of the Council of the Arts and Humanities Research Council, the Board of the Consortium of Humanities Centers and Institutes, and is President of the European Institutes for Advanced Study (NetIAS).

Goldhill is a well-known lecturer and broadcaster and has appeared on television and radio in England, Australia, the United States and Canada. His books have been translated into ten languages, and he has been profiled by newspapers in Brazil, Australia and the Netherlands.

Education
Goldhill was educated at University College School in Hampstead, London, and King's College, Cambridge, where he graduated with a first-class honours degree in 1978 and a PhD in 1982. While at Cambridge he was awarded the university's prestigious Chancellor's Medal for poetry.

Research 
Goldhill's research interests include Greek Tragedy, Greek Culture, Literary Theory, Later Greek Literature, and Reception. His latest books include Victorian Culture and Classical Antiquity: Art, Opera, Fiction and the Proclamation of Modernity (2011), based on his Martin Lectures at Oberlin College in 2010, and Sophocles and the Language of Tragedy (2012), based on his Onassis Lectures, delivered across America in 2011.

His books have won international prizes in three different subject areas. Victorian Culture and Classical Antiquity won the 2012 Robert Lowry Patten Award for "the best recent study in nineteenth-century British literary studies or the best recent study in British literary studies of the Restoration and Eighteenth Century" published between 2010 and 2012. Sophocles and the Language of Tragedy won the 2013 Runciman Award for the best book on a Greek topic, ancient or modern. Jerusalem, City of Longing won the Independent Publishers Gold medal for History in 2010.

Goldhill was the Principal Investigator for a project on The Bible and Antiquity in 19th-Century Culture, funded by the European Research Council and based at CRASSH, in collaboration with the Cambridge Classics Faculty. The team consisted of six postdoctoral fellows and the following directors of the project:

 Professor Simon Goldhill, Professor of Greek, Director of CRASSH (PI)
 Professor James Secord, Professor of History of Science, Director Darwin Project
 Professor Janet Soskice, Faculty of Divinity
 Scott Mandelbrote, Faculty of History
 Dr Michael Ledger-Lomas, Faculty of History
 Dr Jeremy Morris, King's College, Cambridge.

Books
 The Christian Invention of Time: Temporality and the Literature of Late Antiquity, Cambridge University Press, 2022, ISBN 9781316512906
Preposterous Poetics: The Politics and Aesthetics of Form in Late Antiquity, Cambridge University Press, 2020, ISBN 9781108860024
A Very Queer Family Indeed: Sex, Religion, and the Bensons in Victorian Britain, University of Chicago Press, 2016
 Sophocles and the Language of Tragedy, Oxford University Press, 2012, 
 Freud's Couch, Scott's Buttocks, Brontë's Grave, University of Chicago Press, 2011, 
 The End of Dialogue in Antiquity, Cambridge University Press, 2009,  (editor)
 Jerusalem: City of Longing,  Harvard University Press, 2008, 
 How to Stage Greek Tragedy Today, University of Chicago Press, 2007, 
 Being Greek Under Rome: Cultural Identity, the Second Sophistic and the Development of Empire, Cambridge University Press, 2007,  (editor)
 Rethinking Revolutions through Ancient Greece, Cambridge University Press, 2006,  (co-editor with Robin Osborne)
 The Temple of Jerusalem, Harvard University Press, 2005, 
 Love, Sex and Tragedy: How the Ancient World Shapes Our Lives, University of Chicago Press, 2004,  Excerpt
 The Invention of Prose, Oxford University Press, 2002, 
 Who Needs Greek?: Contests in the Cultural History of Hellenism, Cambridge University Press, 2002, 
 Performance Culture and Athenian Democracy, Cambridge University Press, 1999,  (co-editor with Robin Osborne)
 Foucault's Virginity: Ancient Erotic Fiction and the History of Sexuality, Cambridge University Press, 1995, 
 Art and Text in Greek Culture, Cambridge University Press, 1994,  (co-editor with Robin Osborne)
 The Poet's Voice: Essays on Poetics and Greek Literature, Cambridge University Press, 1991, 
 Reading Greek Tragedy, Cambridge University Press, 1986, 
 Language, Sexuality, Narrative: The Oresteia, Cambridge University Press, 1985,

References

External links
"The Perfect Body", an excerpt from Love, Sex & Tragedy: How the Ancient World Shapes Our Lives.
Professor Simon Goldhill, Cambridge
The Sigmund H. Danziger, Jr. Memorial Lecture in the Humanities (The Sigmund H. Danziger, Jr. Memorial Lecture in the Humanities 2000–2001)

1957 births
Living people
Alumni of King's College, Cambridge
British classical scholars
Fellows of King's College, Cambridge
Hellenists
Members of the University of Cambridge faculty of classics
European Research Council grantees
Kennedy Scholarships